"You Keep Coming Back Like a Song" is a popular song written by Irving Berlin for the 1946 film Blue Skies, where it was introduced by Bing Crosby. The song was nominated for "Best Song" in 1946 but lost out to "On the Atchison, Topeka and the Santa Fe". Dinah Shore's version was biggest in the US reaching the No. 5 spot, while Crosby's version (recorded July 18, 1946)  peaked at No. 12. Jo Stafford also had chart success with it and her version achieved the No.11 position.

Other notable recordings 
 Ella Fitzgerald - Ella Fitzgerald Sings the Irving Berlin Songbook (1958)
 Georgia Gibbs - originally recorded in 1946 and later included in her album "Her Nibs!! Miss Georgia Gibbs"
 Maude Maggart included the song in her 2005 album "Maude Maggart Sings Irving Berlin".
 Red Garland recorded it for his 1959 album Red Garland Revisited! (Prestige).

References

Songs written by Irving Berlin
Bing Crosby songs
Ella Fitzgerald songs
Jo Stafford songs
1946 songs
Songs written for films